Pro Wrestling Guerrilla has held a variety of professional wrestling tournaments competed for by wrestlers that are a part of their roster.

Sporadic tournaments

Bad Ass Mother 3000
The Bad Ass Mother 3000 was a tournament held on August 29 and 30, 2003, in Eagle Rock, California and City of Industry, California. The winner of the tournament would become the inaugural PWG Champion.

* B-Boy suffered an injury and was replaced by Lil' Cholo.

Tango & Cash Invitational
The Tango & Cash Invitational was a tag team tournament held on January 24 and 25, 2004, in Santa Ana, California. The winners of the tournament would be crowned the first ever PWG Tag Team Champions.

Participants:
Apollo Kahn and Sara Del Rey
Babi Slymm and Matt Cross
The Ballard Brothers (Shane Ballard and Shannon Ballard)
Chris Bosh and Quicksilver
Christopher Daniels and The Messiah
Disco Machine and Rising Son
Double Dragon (American Dragon and Super Dragon)
Excalibur and Jonny Storm
The Gold Bond Mafia (Chris Hero and CM Punk)
Hardkore Inc. (Al Katrazz and Hardkore Kidd)
Havana Pitbulls (Ricky Reyes and Rocky Romero)
The Iron Saints (Sal Thomaselli and Vito Thomaselli)
Los Luchas (Phoenix Star and Zokre)
Strong Style Thugz/Team Friday (B-Boy and Homicide)
Puma and Samoa Joe
X Foundation (Joey Ryan and Scott Lost)

PWG World Championship #1 Contender's Tournament
The eight-man tournament to determine the #1 contender for Joey Ryan's PWG World Championship was held on both nights of the All Star Weekend 3 on April 8, 2006 and April 9, 2006.

¡Dia de los Dangerous!
¡Dia de los Dangerous! PWG World Championship Tournament was a one night tournament held on February 24, 2008, in Reseda, California to crown the new PWG World Champion, after the former Champion Low Ki was forced to vacate the title due to an injury. Roderick Strong who was booked to challenge Low Ki at the event was given an automatic spot in the finals of the tournament.

* This was a No Disqualification match
† This was a three-way dance

Battle of Los Angeles

Dynamite Duumvirate Tag Team Title Tournament

See also
Professional wrestling tournament

References

Pro Wrestling Guerrilla
Professional wrestling tournaments
Professional wrestling-related lists